Fairholme is a Tudor Revival historic mansion in Newport, Rhode Island designed by Frank Furness and built by Furness & Hewitt in 1874-1875 for Fairman Rogers.  One of the many "cottages" built during the Gilded Age on beachfront property in the Newport area, it is located on a parcel of 4.3 acres near the eastern end of Ruggles Avenue with an ocean frontage of 425 feet. It was remodeled in 1905 by John R. Drexel at a substantial cost but, after passing through the hands of Alphonso P. Villa, was sold before 1955, during the period when the rich were impacted by high tax rates, to Robert A. Young for $38,000. 

It was owned by Palm Beach resident John Noffo Kahn, an heir to the Annenberg publishing fortune. 

The Gilded Age estate was on the market for $16,900,000. It is located on Ochre Point, south of The Breakers on the south side of Ruggles Avenue between the neighboring mansions of Midcliffe and Angelsea. The stables on Ruggles Avenue, historically used as the gardener's cottage, was acquired by Salve Regina University in 1991 and converted to a residence hall, Jean and David W. Wallace Hall.

It was bought by American businessperson Doug Manchester in the summer of 2015, and subsequently sold a year later, in 2016 for $16.1MM.

References

External links

Wikimapia entry

Houses in Newport, Rhode Island
Residential buildings completed in 1875
Tudor Revival architecture in Rhode Island
Gilded Age mansions